Aliabad-e Asgarkhan (also Romanized as ‘Alīābād-e ‘Asgarkhān; also known as ‘Alīābād and ‘Alīābād-e ‘Askarkhān) is a village in Baladeh Kojur Rural District, in the Central District of Nowshahr County, Mazandaran Province, Iran. At the 2006 census, its population was 1,680, in 458 families.

References 

Populated places in Nowshahr County